The 1950 Atlantic hurricane season was the first year in the Atlantic hurricane database (HURDAT) that storms were given names in the Atlantic basin. Names were taken from the Joint Army/Navy Phonetic Alphabet, with the first named storm being designated "Able", the second "Baker", and so on. It was a very active season with sixteen tropical storms, with eleven of them developing into hurricanes. Six of these hurricanes were intense enough to be classified as major hurricanes—a denomination reserved for storms that attained sustained winds equivalent to a Category 3 or greater on the present-day Saffir–Simpson scale. One storm, the twelfth of the season, was unnamed and was originally excluded from the yearly summary, and three additional storms were discovered in re-analysis. The large quantity of strong storms during the year yielded, prior to modern reanalysis, what was the highest seasonal accumulated cyclone energy (ACE) of the 20th century in the Atlantic basin; 1950 held the seasonal ACE record until broken by the 1995 Atlantic hurricane season. However, later examination by researchers determined that several storms in the 1950 season were weaker than thought, leading to a lower ACE than assessed originally. This season also set the record for the most tropical storms, eight, in the month of October.

The tropical cyclones of the season produced a total of 88 fatalities and $38.5 million in property damage (1950 USD). The first officially named Atlantic hurricane was Hurricane Able, which formed on August 12, brushed the North Carolina coastline, and later moved across Atlantic Canada. The strongest hurricane of the season, Hurricane Dog, reached the equivalent of a Category 4 hurricane on the Saffir–Simpson scale and caused extensive damage to the Leeward Islands. Two major hurricanes affected Florida: Easy produced the highest 24-hour rainfall total recorded in the United States, while King struck downtown Miami as a Category 4 hurricane and caused $27.75 million (1950 USD) of damage. The two major landfalls made the 1945–1950 period the only five-year period to feature five major hurricane landfalls in the United States—a record that held until tied in 2000–2005. The last storm of the year, an unnamed tropical storm, dissipated on November 13.

Seasonal summary

The season officially began on June 15 and ended on November 15; these dates conventionally delimit the period of each year when most tropical cyclones form in the Atlantic basin. Although the season began on June 15, tropical activity typically does not begin before August. The tropics remained tranquil through early August, and the U.S. Weather Bureau noted that the season had been "remarkably quiet". The inactive period ended on August 12, when the first tropical storm developed east of the Lesser Antilles. This storm received the name "Able" as part of the Joint Army/Navy Phonetic Alphabet. (The same alphabet was also used in the 1951 and 1952 seasons, before being replaced by female naming in 1953.)

Before the end of August, four hurricanes had formed in the Atlantic, two of which attained major hurricane status. A major hurricane is a tropical cyclone with winds of at least ; a storm of this intensity would be classified as a Category 3 or greater on the Saffir-Simpson Hurricane Scale introduced in the 1970s. In contrast to the busy August, only three named storms developed in September—although three of the August hurricanes lasted into September. It was among the most severe hurricanes on record in Antigua, where the hurricane struck early in its duration. Eight tropical storms or hurricanes formed in October, which is greater than in any other year.

In total, there were sixteen tropical storms during the season, of which five (Tropical Storm How, Tropical Storm Mike and three unnamed tropical storms) did not attain hurricane status. Overall, six major hurricanes occurred during the year.  The Hurricane Hunters made about 300 flights into hurricanes during the season, the most since the practice began in 1943. The number of storms was above average; in a typical year, eleven tropical storms, six hurricanes, and between two and three major hurricanes take place. With the numerous major hurricanes, the season produced a high accumulated cyclone energy (ACE) of 211, although it was originally assessed as 243 before reanalysis. At one point, the 1950 total was the highest on record, before being surpassed by the 2005 season. This value is an approximation of the combined kinetic energy used by all tropical cyclones throughout the season.

Systems

Hurricane Able

The beginning of the hurricane season was inactive, with the formation of no tropical cyclones during June or July. The first storm of the year originated from a tropical wave that exited the west coast of Africa around August 5. Its status over the next few days were unknown due to sparse observations. On August 12, the system was designated Tropical Storm Able east of the Lesser Antilles, which strengthened to hurricane status on August 14. Able gradually intensified as it tracked generally west-northwestward, and by 12:00 UTC on August 17, Able became a major hurricane. Initially, Able was thought to pose a threat to the Bahamas and Florida. The storm later turned to the northeast, passing just offshore Cape Hatteras, North Carolina and Cape Cod. Steadily weakening and accelerating, Able struck Nova Scotia as a minimal hurricane, and later struck Newfoundland as an extratropical storm. It dissipated early on August 24 in the far northern Atlantic Ocean.

Along the coast of North Carolina, the hurricane produced light winds and rough waves, as well as moderate precipitation. Heavier rainfall occurred in southern New England, causing flooding in portions of New York City and producing slick roads that caused nine traffic fatalities. Able produced hurricane-force winds in Nova Scotia, and damage across Canada totaled over $1 million (1950 CAD, $  USD) in the agriculture, communications, and fishing industries. Two people died in Canada when their raft was overturned.

Hurricane Baker

A tropical wave exited western Africa on August 13, which developed into Tropical Storm Baker east of the Lesser Antilles on August 18. It moved northwestward and later turned to the west, attaining hurricane status on August 21. The next day, the hurricane attained Category 2 intensity just as it crossed over Antigua, where heavy damage was reported. More than 100 homes were damaged or destroyed, which left thousands homeless. Afterward, the hurricane began to weaken, and later on August 22 its winds decreased to tropical storm status. The cyclone then struck Montserrat as a strong tropical storm. The next day it struck southwestern Puerto Rico, and shortly thereafter weakened into a tropical depression, passing over the Dominican Republic. Baker turned more to the west, re-attaining tropical storm status before striking eastern Cuba on August 24. In Cuba, 37 people died, and the property losses reached several million dollars.

On August 25, Baker weakened to tropical depression status while crossing Cuba, but soon thereafter regained tropical storm intensity in the western Caribbean Sea. Two days later, Baker entered the Gulf of Mexico, and by the next day Baker had regained hurricane status. Property and crop damage totaled $2.55 million (1950 USD), primarily between Mobile, Alabama and Saint Marks, Florida. Torrential rainfall fell throughout the region, with the largest total occurring in Caryville, Florida, where  of precipitation were recorded. The heavy precipitation was responsible for extensive crop damage across the region. The hurricane also spawned two tornadoes, one of which destroyed four houses and a building in Apalachicola, Florida. In Birmingham, Alabama, high wind downed power lines, which caused one death and two injuries due to live wires. While inland, Baker tracked northwestward and eventually dissipated over southeastern Missouri on September 1.

Hurricane Charlie

Hurricane Charlie developed on August 21 to the southwest of the Cape Verde islands. At the time, the Weather Bureau did not consider Charlie to be a tropical cyclone until almost a week later. For four days, the storm tracked generally to the west as a weak tropical storm. On August 25, it turned to the northwest and intensified, becoming a hurricane on August 28. At the time, the hurricane was stalled to the east-southeast of Bermuda, and subsequently turned to a westward drift. On September 2, Charlie turned to the north and northeast. At the time, it co-existed with two other hurricanes, Dog and Easy; it is a rare occurrence for three hurricanes to exist simultaneously in the Atlantic. It dissipated later on September 5 without having affected land.

Hurricane Dog

Hurricane Dog is believed to have developed from a tropical wave that left the coast of Africa on August 24. Its first observation as a tropical cyclone occurred on August 30, when it was a  hurricane; the storm is believed to have begun farther east as a Cape Verde-type hurricane, but was not detectable before August 30. At the time, Dog was located east of the Lesser Antilles, and it quickly attained major hurricane status as it moved to the west-northwest. It was considered among the worst hurricanes in the history of Antigua, where thousands were left homeless. Damage was estimated at $1 million (1950 USD, $  USD), and there were two deaths from drowning in the region.

After passing through the Leeward Islands, the hurricane turned to a northerly drift with continued intensification.

Maintaining peak intensity for about 18 hours, Dog began a weakening trend as it made a sharp turn to the west. It accelerated to the north on September 10, and two days later Dog passed within  of Cape Cod. Newspapers attributed heavy rainfall in the Mid-Atlantic states—which resulted in five deaths—to the hurricane. Further north, the hurricane killed 12 people in New England, and produced a total of $2 million (1950 USD, $  USD) of property damage. Twelve others died in two shipwrecks off the coast of Canada. The hurricane later became a strong extratropical cyclone, maintaining hurricane-force winds while passing south of Nova Scotia and eventually hitting Scotland with hurricane-force gusts on September 18.

Hurricane Easy

Hurricane Easy developed on September 1 from a trough in the western Caribbean, which persisted after Hurricane Baker moved through the region in late August. Moving northeastward, the hurricane crossed Cuba on September 3 and entered the Gulf of Mexico. Easy turned to the northwest and strengthened to its peak intensity as a Category 3 hurricane. At the time, Easy was located just off the west coast of Florida; however, a ridge to its north caused the hurricane to stall, execute a small loop, and make landfall near Cedar Key. Following the landfall, Easy moved offshore, turned to the southeast, and made a second landfall near Hernando Beach on September 6. The hurricane turned northwestward over the Florida Peninsula, and gradually weakened as it moved into Georgia and the southeastern United States. On September 9, Easy dissipated over northeastern Arkansas.

Damage in Cuba was minor, although large portions of western Florida experienced hurricane-force winds and heavy rainfall. Yankeetown reported  of precipitation in 24 hours, which at the time was the largest 24-hour rainfall total on record in the United States. Damage was heaviest in Cedar Key, where half of the houses were destroyed and most of the remaining were damaged. The rainfall caused heavy crop damage in the region. Across the state, Easy caused $3 million in damage (1950 USD), the total was less than expected, due to the sparse population of the affected area. Additionally, the hurricane was indirectly responsible for two deaths by electrocution. At the time, Easy was also known as the "Cedar Keys Hurricane".

Hurricane Fox

On September 8, Tropical Storm Fox was present in the open Atlantic Ocean between the Lesser Antilles and Cape Verde, likely originating from a tropical wave. A small system, the hurricane moved generally northwestward and gradually intensified. Following its peak intensity, the hurricane accelerated to the north and northeast. By September 17, Fox had lost all tropical characteristics, and later that day the circulation dissipated about halfway between the Azores and Newfoundland. Fox never affected land along its path. When Fox dissipated, it was the first time in 36 days without an active tropical cyclone in the Atlantic Ocean.

Hurricane George

Tropical Storm George originated on September 27 from a strong tropical wave northeast of the Lesser Antilles and southeast of Bermuda. A large system, it moved to the northwest and later west-northwest. George began strengthening on September 30 as it decreased its forward speed. The next day, while remaining nearly stationary south of Bermuda, a nearby ship reported that George had reached hurricane status. Aside from rainbands, little impact was reported on Bermuda.

The hurricane passed west of Bermuda on October 3. It accelerated to the north and later to the northeast, and on October 5 George transitioned into an extratropical cyclone. Shortly thereafter, it passed just south of Newfoundland, and on October 7 the remnants of George dissipated south of Iceland.

Tropical Storm How

A weak trough existed in the eastern Gulf of Mexico on September 29. A circulation developed within the storm, becoming a tropical depression on October 1. Later that day, the system intensified into Tropical Storm How. Officials advised small boats to remain at port along the Louisiana coast due to the storm. On October 3, Tropical Storm How turned toward the southwest as it began weakening, and the next day it moved ashore near La Pesca, Tamaulipas as a tropical depression. About six hours after making landfall, How dissipated over the Sierra Madre Oriental in northeastern Mexico.

Hurricane Item

On October 4, a trough was present in the western Caribbean Sea, and was possibly a tropical cyclone. Moving northwest, the system crossed the Yucatán Peninsula and became disrupted, while also associating with a cold front. It emerged into the Gulf of Mexico on October 7 and became more defined. On the next day, the system developed into Tropical Storm Item off the northwest coast of the Yucatán Peninsula. It is possible that Item was stronger, due to the storm's small size but lack of direct observations. The hurricane quickly dissipated over land.

In the sparsely populated area where Item moved ashore, the hurricane dropped heavy rainfall. Newspaper reports considered it the worst storm to hit Mexico in ten years, with damage in Veracruz totaling around $1.5 million (1950 USD, $  USD). The strong winds sank 20 ships, and although there were no reports of casualties, Item caused 15 injuries. Communications were disrupted across the region, and downed trees blocked roads. Near Tuxpam, the winds damaged large areas of banana plantations.

Hurricane Jig

A tropical storm was first observed on October 11 in the central Atlantic Ocean, northeast of the Lesser Antilles and southeast of Bermuda. Two days later, a ship reported strong winds and a rapid pressure drop, indicating a hurricane was in the region; the tropical cyclone was given the name Jig. It moved northwestward, steadily intensifying before turning to the north and northeast. The hurricane began weakening on October 16. Jig became an extratropical cyclone later that day and quickly dissipated, never having affected land due to its small size.

Hurricane King

A trough was present in the western Caribbean on October 11. It is estimated that a tropical depression developed just off the north coast of Honduras on October 13, which moved northeastward and intensified into Tropical Storm King the next day. The tropical storm was a small weather system throughout its duration. On October 16, King reached hurricane strength while the passing between Jamaica and the Cayman Islands. The hurricane killed seven people and caused $2 million (1950 USD, $  USD) in damage throughout the country.

After crossing Cuba, King rapidly deepened as it turned toward South Florida, becoming the sixth and final major hurricane of the season on October 18. The swath of destructive winds was only , likened to a small tornado. Early on October 19, King weakened to tropical storm status over north-central Florida, and on the next day it dissipated over western Georgia. There was one additional death in Georgia.

Across Florida, damage totaled $27.75 million (1950 USD, $  USD), of which $15 million (1950 USD, $  USD) was in the Miami metropolitan area. A preliminary survey indicated there were 12,290 houses damaged in the region, with an additional eight destroyed. Along its path through the state, strong winds were observed around Lake Okeechobee, with a  gust in Clewiston. Overall, there were three deaths in the state.

Tropical Storm Twelve

A tropical storm was present in the east-central Atlantic on October 17. It moved northwestward at first before turning to the northeast on October 19, when it was already a small, compact tropical cyclone. Maintaining its peak strength for 30 hours, the storm began a steady weakening trend before crossing through the southern Azores. It turned to the southeast, weakening to tropical depression status on October 24. Subsequently, the system turned to the south and quickly dissipated. This tropical storm was not included in the Monthly Weather Review's summary of the 1950 hurricane season, and it was added to the Atlantic hurricane database in 1959.

Hurricane Love

In the wake of Hurricane King moving northward through Florida, an area of low pressure developed into a tropical cyclone on October 18 south of Louisiana. This storm was given the name Love and quickly strengthened, reaching hurricane status shortly thereafter. The storm initially moved westward across the Gulf of Mexico, but soon swung southward into the central portion of the Gulf on October 19. Hurricane Love's maximum sustained winds are believed to have reached their peak intensity early on October 20. Throughout the hurricane's track, dry air infringed on the western side of the tropical cyclone's circulation, which produced unfavorable conditions for additional tropical cyclogenesis. On October 20, the storm began curving northeastward towards the coast of western Florida; however, the dry air completely circled Love's center of circulation, drastically weakening the cyclone in the process. On October 21, Love weakened to a tropical storm, and it struck the Big Bend region of Florida, north of Cedar Key. At the time, its winds were only of moderate gale force, and the storm degenerated into a trough of low pressure shortly thereafter. This combined with an approaching cold front to produce a powerful extratropical storm.

Certain areas began preparing for the storm along Florida's west coast. Hospitals set up emergency facilities in case of power failure, and some coastal residents left their homes. Initially, the storm was forecast to strike the Tampa area, but missed to the north as it weakened. It reportedly left little damage in the sparsely populated land where it made landfall.

Tropical Storm Mike

A westerly moving trough was evident in the east-central Atlantic Ocean on October 24, south of a dissipating cold front. Ships in the region reported light winds, and surface observations suggested that a circulation developed by October 25; on that basis, it is estimated that a tropical depression formed. An approaching cold front turned the storm northward, which absorbed the storm on October 28. The Air Weather Service (AWS) noted the system as "Storm Mike", but the storm was not included in the annual Monthly Weather Review summary, nor was it included in the database until it was added by the Atlantic hurricane reanalysis project in 2014.

Tropical Storm Fifteen

It was estimated to have originated the previous day. The small storm moved to the northwest and later west into an area of sparse observations, suggesting a weaker system. The system's track ended on October 29 due to uncertainty, but it was estimated to have dissipated soon after.

Tropical Storm Sixteen

For several days in November, a trough was present across the west-central Atlantic Ocean. It was a large system, and would likely have been classified a subtropical cyclone in the satellite era. The storm moved northeastward and weakened, degenerating into a trough on November 12 before being merging with another system.

Storm names

This was the first season in the Atlantic hurricane database in which cyclones that attained at least tropical storm status were given names. The names used to name storms during the 1950 season were taken from the Joint Army/Navy Phonetic Alphabet, which was also used in the 1951 and 1952 hurricane seasons before being replaced by female names in 1953.

Season effects
This is a table of all the storms that have formed in the 1950 Atlantic hurricane season. It includes their duration, names, landfall(s), denoted in parentheses, damages, and death totals. Deaths in parentheses are additional and indirect (an example of an indirect death would be a traffic accident), but were still related to that storm. Damage and deaths include totals while the storm was extratropical, a tropical wave, or a low, and all the damage figures are in 1950 USD.

See also

1950 Pacific hurricane season
1950 Pacific typhoon season
Atlantic hurricane season
Lists of Atlantic hurricanes
1950s Australian region cyclone seasons
1950s North Indian Ocean cyclone seasons

Notes

References

External links

 Monthly Weather Review

 
Articles which contain graphical timelines